William Encarnacion Alcantara (born 28 June 1988, San Juan de la Maguana) is a Dominican Republic boxer. At the 2012 Summer Olympics, he competed in the Men's bantamweight, but was defeated in the second round by Algerian Mohamed Ouadahi.

References

External links 
 

Living people
Olympic boxers of the Dominican Republic
Boxers at the 2012 Summer Olympics
Bantamweight boxers
Dominican Republic male boxers

1988 births
People from San Juan Province (Dominican Republic)